The 1986 United States Senate election in Arizona was held on November 4, 1986. Incumbent Republican U.S. Senator Barry Goldwater decided to retire instead of seeking a sixth term. The open seat was won by John McCain, a Republican congressman from Arizona's 1st congressional district and former Navy officer, as well as future 2008 presidential nominee against Democrat Barack Obama. McCain would remain in the Senate until his death on August 25, 2018.

General election

Candidates
 Richard Kimball, former member of the Arizona Corporation Commission and State Senator (Democratic)
 John McCain, U.S. Representative from Phoenix (Republican)

Campaign
Kimball's campaign was subject to negative press from the Arizona Republic and Phoenix Gazette.  One Gazette columnist described him as displaying "terminal weirdness." McCain ultimately won the election by a margin of 21%.

Results

See also 
 1986 United States Senate elections

References 

Arizona
1986
1986 Arizona elections
John McCain